The Dr. Robert M. Ross House is a historic house in Artesia, New Mexico. It was built in 1904 for Dr Robert M. Ross, a physician from St. Louis, Missouri who became the founding president of the First National Bank of Artesia in 1903. His wife, who worked in the post office, co-founded the public library in Artesia. The house was designed in the Queen Anne architectural style. It has been listed on the National Register of Historic Places since March 2, 1984.

References

Houses on the National Register of Historic Places in New Mexico
National Register of Historic Places in Eddy County, New Mexico
Queen Anne architecture in New Mexico
Houses completed in 1904